Drachmannlegatet is a Danish literary award founded in 1917, based on funding derived from the entrance fee to Drachmanns Hus in Skagen. The winner is announced annually on 9 October, the anniversary of the birthday of Danish writer and painter Holger Drachmann (1846–1908).

List of recipients 

2021 Kristian Ditlev Jensen
2022 Jesper Wung-Sung

References

External links 
 Drachmannshus (in Danish)
 litteraturpriser.dk (in Danish)

Danish literary awards
Holger Drachmann